Alissoderus is a genus of beetles in the family Buprestidae, containing the following species:

 Alissoderus albiventris (Gory & Laporte, 1839)
 Alissoderus cuprascens (Gory & Laporte, 1839)
 Alissoderus leucogaster (Wiedemann, 1821)
 Alissoderus magnus Kerremans, 1911
 Alissoderus rex Obenberger, 1931
 Alissoderus spectrum (Fahreus, 1851)
 Alissoderus strandi Obenberger, 1931
 Alissoderus superciliosus (Wiedemann, 1821)
 Alissoderus tessellatus Bellamy, 2000
 Alissoderus transvalensis Obenberger, 1931
 Alissoderus vittatus Lansberge, 1886

References

Buprestidae genera